Ghāzī Amānullāh International Cricket Stadium, Jalalabad is an international standard cricket stadium in Afghanistan. It is located in the heart of Ghazi Amanullah Town, a new suburb of Jalalabad in Nangarhar Province.

Construction on the stadium began in March 2010 when the foundation stone was laid by Minister of Finance and president of the Afghanistan Cricket Board, Omar Zakhilwal. The project was developed on 30 acres of land donated by the developer constructing Ghazi Amanullah Town. The first phase of construction, which took a year to complete, cost $1.8 million, and included the completion of the basic stadium. A pavilion, accommodation for players and administrative buildings were constructed later.

The stadium, which has a capacity of 14,000, was completed before the national team and under-19 team left for Canada and the Under-19 Cricket World Cup Qualifier in Ireland respectively. The two sides inaugurated the stadium in a Twenty20 match.

It is hoped that the stadium will be able to attract international teams to play Afghanistan, which is now a Full Member of the International Cricket Council.

Stadiums in Afghanistan 

The Ghazi Amanullah International Cricket Stadium is the second largest stadium in Afghanistan.

References

External links 
 
 
 Ghazi Amanullah Khan International Cricket Stadium, Gazi Amanullah Khan Town at CricketArchive

Cricket grounds in Afghanistan
Buildings and structures in Nangarhar Province
Jalalabad